Parantica agleoides, the dark glassy tiger, is a butterfly found in India that belongs to the crows and tigers, that is, the danaid group of the brush-footed butterflies family.

Description
Like Parantica aglea, but differs structurally in vein 11 of forewing not being anastomosed with 12; the semihyaline streaks and spots on both forewing and hindwing are shorter and narrower, especially on the latter, where a larger area of black margin beyond the streaks is shown than in P. aglea; the short slender streak between the apices of the two cellular streaks on the hindwing is longer and always free, never joined on either to the upper or to the lower streak. On the underside the ground colour is of a browner tint than in aglea.  Male sex-mark in form 2.

Range
North-eastern India, Burma and Indomalaya until Java.

See also
List of butterflies of India
List of butterflies of India (Nymphalidae)

References

Parantica
Butterflies of Asia
Butterflies of Singapore
Butterflies of Java
Butterflies described in 1860